In structural engineering, a pre-engineered building (PEB) is designed by a PEB supplier or PEB manufacturer with a single design to be fabricated using various materials and methods to satisfy a wide range of structural and aesthetic design requirements. This is contrasted with a building built to a design that was created specifically for that building.  Within some geographic industry sectors pre-engineered buildings are also called pre-engineered metal buildings (PEMB) or, as is becoming increasingly common due to the reduced amount of pre-engineering involved in custom computer-aided designs, simply engineered metal buildings (EMB).

During the 1960s, standardized engineering designs for buildings were first marketed as PEBs. Historically, the primary framing structure of a pre-engineered building is an assembly of -shaped members, often referred to as I-beams. In pre-engineered buildings, the I beams used are usually formed by welding together steel plates to form the I section. The I beams are then field-assembled (e.g. bolted connections) to form the entire frame of the pre-engineered building. Some manufacturers taper the framing members (varying in web depth) according to the local loading effects. Larger plate dimensions are used in areas of higher load effects.

Other forms of primary framing can include trusses, mill sections rather than three-plate welded, castellated beams, etc. The choice of economic form can vary depending on factors such as local capabilities (e.g. manufacturing, transportation, construction) and variations in material vs. labour costs. 

Typically, primary frames are 2D type frames (i.e. may be analyzed using two-dimensional techniques). Advances in computer-aided design technology, materials and manufacturing capabilities have assisted a growth in alternate forms of pre-engineered building such as the tension fabric building and more sophisticated analysis (e.g. three-dimensional) as is required by some building codes.

Cold formed Z- and C-shaped members may be used as secondary structural elements to fasten and support the external cladding.

Roll-formed profiled steel sheet, wood, tensioned fabric, precast concrete, masonry block, glass curtainwall or other materials may be used for the external cladding of the building.

In order to accurately design a pre-engineered building, engineers consider the clear span between bearing points, bay spacing, roof slope, live loads, dead loads, collateral loads, wind uplift, deflection criteria, internal crane system and maximum practical size and weight of fabricated members. Historically, pre-engineered building manufacturers have developed pre-calculated tables for different structural elements in order to allow designers to select the most efficient I beams size for their projects. However, the table selection procedures are becoming rare with the evolution in computer-aided custom designs.

While pre-engineered buildings can be adapted to suit a wide variety of structural applications, the greatest economy will be realized when utilising standard details. An efficiently designed pre-engineered building can be lighter than the conventional steel buildings by up to 30%. Lighter weight equates to less steel and a potential price savings in structural framework.

Project professionals and manufacturer-designed buildings

The project architect, sometimes called the Architect of Record, is typically responsible for aspects such as aesthetic, dimensional, occupant comfort and fire safety. When a pre-engineered building is selected for a project, the architect accepts conditions inherent in the manufacturer's product offerings for aspects such as materials, colours, structural form, dimensional modularity, etc. Despite the existence of the manufacturer's standard assembly details, the architect remains responsible to ensure that the manufacturer's product and assembly is consistent with the building code requirements (e.g. continuity of air/vapour retarders, insulation, rain screen; size and location of exits; fire rated assemblies) and occupant/owner expectations.

Many jurisdictions recognize the distinction between the project engineer, sometimes called the Engineer of Record, and the manufacturer's employee or subcontract engineer, sometimes called a specialty engineer. The principal differences between these two entities on a project are the limits of commercial obligation, professional responsibility and liability.

The structural Engineer of Record is responsible to specify the design parameters for the project (e.g. materials, loads, design standards, service limits) and to ensure that the element and assembly designs by others are consistent in the global context of the finished building.

The specialty engineer is responsible to design only those elements which the manufacturer is commercially obligated to supply (e.g. by contract) and to communicate the assembly procedures, design assumptions and responses, to the extent that the design relies on or affects work by others, to the Engineer of Record – usually described in the manufacturer's erection drawings and assembly manuals. The manufacturer produces an engineered product but does not typically provide engineering services to the project.

In the context described, the Architect and Engineer of Record are the designers of the building and bear ultimate responsibility for the performance of the completed work. A buyer should be aware of the project professional distinctions when developing the project plan.

These prefabricated structures are widely used in the residential as well as industrial sector  for its unmatched characteristics.

References 

Structural engineering
Structural system